Michal Beran may refer to:
 Michal Beran (ice hockey)
 Michal Beran (footballer)